Dracula's Castle may refer to:
 The fictional Castle Dracula in Bram Stoker's novel Dracula
 Bran Castle, a tourist attraction in Romania
 Poenari Castle, a castle of Vlad III Dracula
 Hunyad Castle, a castle which was Vlad III Dracula's prison 
 Orava Castle, a location where Nosferatu was filmed
 "Castle Dracula", a song by Priestess from certain editions of the album Prior to the Fire
 "Dracula's Castle", a song by New Order from their album Waiting for the Sirens' Call
 The titular castle in the video game series Castlevania

Dracula